Qarqucaq (also, Karkudzhan, Karkudzhak, Karakudzhakh, and Karakudzhak) is a village and municipality in the Goranboy Rayon of Azerbaijan.  It has a population of 745.

References 

Populated places in Goranboy District